Gudrun Houlberg (21 February 1889 – 14 January 1940) was a Danish actress who appeared in over 40 films from 1910 to 1934. She is remembered in particular for her roles in Klovnen (1917) and Grevindens ære (1919).

Biography
Born on 21 February 1889 in Viborg, Gudrun Houlberg was the daughter of the merchant Anton Nielsen Houlberg (1863–1949) and his wife Sørine Pouline Frederikke Prahl (1867–1955). She attended the school run by the Royal Danish Theatre in Copenhagen where she made her stage début in 1906. After spending a period at the Dagmar Theatre (Dagmarteatret) from 1914 to 1918, she returned to the Royal Theatre.

She made her film début with Nordisk Film in 1910 when she appeared in the silent film Et gensyn. In 1912 she moved to the film department of Skandinavisk-Russisk Handelshus where she appeared in almost 30 films until she was engaged by Nordisk Film in 1916. In 1917, she played the role of a bareback circus rider in A.W. Sandberg's highly successful Klovnen, together with Valdemar Psilander who became her partner until he died a few months later. She acted in a long series of silent romances and comedies with Nordisk Film. In 1934, using her married name Gudrun Middelboe, she took the role of Frk. Thomsen in Emanuel Gregers' sound film Skaf en sensation (Create a Sensation). With her dark hair and fine features, Houlberg was contrasted sharply with the other Danish star of the period, the fair-haired daredevil Emilie Sannom.

In 1917, she married the opera singer Helge Nissen (1871–1926) and in 1932, the engineer Poul Middelboe but the marriage did not last. Gudrun Houlberg died on 14 January 1940 in Rome, aged 50.

Filmography
The following are listed by Det Danske Filminstitut:

Skaf en Sensation (1934) - Frk. Thomsen
Præsten i Vejlby (1931) - Aalsø-præstens kone
Prinsens Kærlighed (1920) - Melitta, Schönstadts datter
Manden, der sejrede (1920) - Ellinor, Rewes' datter
Blind Passager (1920) - Edith, professorens datter
Det døde Skib (1920) - John, skibsdreng
Kærlighedsleg (1919) - Amy Walker
Lykkens Blændværk (1919) - Eva, godsejerens datter
Grevindens Ære (1919) - Prinsesse Alexis, fyrstedatter
Skandalemageren (1919) - Mercia, Francis' datter
Godsejeren (1919) - Ellinor, James' datter
Den grønne Bille (1918) - Violet, Hornes datter
Kornspekulanten (1918) - Inger, korngrosserens datter
Hans Kæreste (1918) - Esther
Hjertebetvingeren (1918) - Millicent Town
Ægteskabshaderne (1918) - Daisy, Singletons datter
Klovnen (1917) - Daisy, Bunding's daughter
Brændte Vinger (1917) - Agnes West
Expeditricen fra Østergade (1917) - Alice, Erik's wife
I Storm og Stille (1915) - Alice, Clark's daughter
Enhver (1915) - Sylvia, everyone's girlfriend
Lidenskabens Magt (1915) - Helene, Nyblom's daughter
Britta fra Bakken (1915) - Britta, Mother Martha's daughter
Fattig og rig (1915) - Maud, Jones' daughter
Den Stærkeste (1915) - Jolante, the count's daughter
Vera (1915) - Vera, Frantz' wife
Den Fremmede (1914) - Carla, Wang's wife
Arveprinsen (1914) - Mercedes, the duke's daughter
Hans første Kærlighed (1914) - Sibyl
Kvinder (1914) - Mira
Letsind (1914) - Johanne, the widow's daughter
Lykkeligt Ægteskab (1914) - Fru Breit
En Sømandsbrud (1914) - Lillian Bennet
De Dødes Ø (1913) - Flora, dr. Critius' God daughter
Katastrofen i Dokken (1913) - Roland's sister
Den sorte Varieté (1913) - Carmen, varieties dancer
For evigt (1913) - Agathe, Fritz' wife
Hjertedoktoren (1913) - Gertrud von Ahrenskjold, Isas niece
Haanden, der griber (1913) - a bride
Spejderen (1912) - a young woman
Det blaa Blod (1912) - Estate owner's daughter and the count's bride
Dødsridtet (1912) - Kate Holborg, young widow
Konfetti (1912) - Therese Savain
Gift dig - gift dig ikke (1912) - Nelli Elmer
Den hvide Klovn (1912) - circus rider
Slægten (1912) - Karen, Alvilda's daughter from 1st marriage
Elskovsbarnet (1910) - Suzanne, viscount's daughter

References

External links

1889 births
1940 deaths
20th-century Danish actresses
Danish film actresses
People from Viborg Municipality